Ronnie King is an American musician, producer, and co-owner of Blue Label Records with Sean Couevas.

Credits include
 2Pac, keyboards on Still I Rise, Until the End of Time
 Snoop Dogg, Hammond organ on Paid tha Cost to Be da Bo$$
 Cory Mo
 Slim Thug
 UGK
 Glenna Bell
 Mariah Carey, Moog synthesizer on Rainbow
 Shady Montage (Shade Sheist), keyboards on Shake You Down single
 The Offspring, keyboards on Splinter and Days Go By
 NOFX, additional guitar on The War on Errorism
 Rancid, live keyboards on 1998 tour
 Pennywise, Freestyle piano on Full Circle'''s hidden track
 T.S.O.L.
 Bizzy Bone
 The Joykiller, keyboards
 Tyrese, keyboards on I Wanna Go There K-Ci & JoJo
 Pepper (band), keyboards on In With the Old Ten West
 Coolio
 Warren G
 Big Syke
 Kaleo from Pepper (band)
 Craig Mack, keyboards on Operation: Get Down The Distillers, piano on The Distillers Mason Reed
 One11
 Core 10 
 Infierno 18 Keyboards on Ya era hora'' (Argentina)
 Strawberry Moon (producer)
American Supermodel American Supermodel Keyboards, Producer

References

External links
Bio |
Ronnie King
Rap News Network - Ronnie King More Than A Tupac Producer and Keyboard Artist
Ronnie King | Credits

American hip hop record producers
American punk rock musicians
Living people
Year of birth missing (living people)